La Crosse (also La Cross, Lacross) is an unincorporated community in Schley County, Georgia, United States.

Notes

Unincorporated communities in Schley County, Georgia
Unincorporated communities in Georgia (U.S. state)